Otines refer to the female Muslim religious scholars in Central Asia. They were regarded as the guardian of the Islamic faith in the era of Soviet Union.
Otines are recognised as leaders in the local community. Their position has a high status, somewhat similar to a mullah's, and certain otines are officially recognized by their country's Muslim board. Otines also serve as teachers at religious schools for girls.

References

Further reading
 Fathi, Habiba. (March 1997). "Otines: The unknown women clerics of Central Asian Islam". Central Asian Survey 16 (1): 27-43.

Central Asia
Islamic honorifics
Islam and women
Female religious leaders
Female Islamic religious leaders